Jizz Hornkamp (born 7 March 1998) is a Dutch professional footballer who plays as a forward for Eerste Divisie club Willem II.

Career

Heerenveen
Born in De Rijp, North Holland, Hornkamp played in the youth sides of SV De Rijp, Ajax, AZ and SC Heerenveen.  In the 2017–18 season, Hornkamp became part of the first-team squad of Heerenveen, making his debut for the club in the playoffs for the UEFA Europa League on 9 May 2018, a home match against FC Utrecht, which was won 4–3. He came on as a substitute for Reza Ghoochannejhad the 88th minute. He scored his first goal as an injury time substitute on 22 September 2018, the equaliser, against Excelsior. After the winter break of the 2018–19 season, the Heerenveen coaching staff decided to utilise him as a right back, due numerous injuries in defence.

Den Bosch
In July 2019, it was announced that Hornkamp had joined second-tier Eerste Divisie club FC Den Bosch on a three-year contract. There, he stated that he wanted to prove himself as a striker after having mostly been used as a reserve right back in the season before at Heerenveen. He made his debut for the club as a starter on 12 August 2020 in a 2–2 away draw against Jong PSV.

In the 2020–21 season, Hornkamp grew into a proven goalscorer. His first goal for the club came on 31 August 2020 in a 4–2 away loss against De Graafschap – a header after an assist provided by Don Bolsius in the 80th minute. After having scored four goals during the first half of the season, his goalscoring took off in the spring. On 30 January 2021, Hornkamp scored four goals in a span of 30 minutes to secure a 4–4 away draw against Excelsior. He also scored braces against Go Ahead Eagles, Dordrecht and Roda JC Kerkrade, to finish the season with 20 goals in 35 appearances.

Willem II
On 24 January 2022, Hornkamp signed with Willem II until the summer of 2024. He made his competitive debut for the club on 6 February, also scoring his first goal as RKC Waalwijk were beaten 3–1.

Career statistics

Club

References

1998 births
People from Graft-De Rijp
Sportspeople from Alkmaar
Living people
Dutch footballers
Association football forwards
SC Heerenveen players
FC Den Bosch players
Willem II (football club) players
Eredivisie players
Eerste Divisie players
Footballers from North Holland
21st-century Dutch people